Pacificulla esdiparki is a moth in the family Lecithoceridae. It was described by Kyu-Tek Park in 2013. It is endemic to New Guinea.

References

esdiparki
Moths of New Guinea
Moths described in 2013
Endemic fauna of New Guinea